The Winnemucca Hotel, located at 95 S. Bridge St. in Winnemucca, Nevada, was an Early Commercial style building that was built in 1863.

It was listed on the National Register of Historic Places in 2005.

It was one of the oldest buildings in Winnemucca and is significant for its role in commercial development of Winnemucca and for association with Basque sheepherders.  It has been known for its potent Basque drink, Picon Punch. The hotel was demolished between 2015 and 2019.

See also
Martin Hotel (Winnemucca, Nevada), also known for Basque sheepherder association and NRHP-listed in Winnemucca

References

Buildings and structures in Humboldt County, Nevada
Hotel
Defunct hotels in Nevada
History of Humboldt County, Nevada
Hotel buildings completed in 1863
Hotel buildings on the National Register of Historic Places in Nevada
National Register of Historic Places in Humboldt County, Nevada
Buildings designated early commercial in the National Register of Historic Places
1863 establishments in Nevada
Basque-American culture in Nevada
Demolished buildings and structures in Nevada
Buildings and structures demolished in 2015
Demolished hotels in the United States